Tree of Freedom is a children's historical novel by Rebecca Caudill. It is a pioneer story set in Kentucky at the time of the American Revolutionary War. The novel, illustrated by Dorothy Morse, was first published in 1949 and was a Newbery Honor recipient in 1950.

Plot summary
The novel tells the story of the Venable family, Jonathan, Bertha, and their five children, who in 1780 walk from North Carolina to Kentucky to homestead on 400 acres. There they build a cabin, plant crops, and raise livestock; 13-year-old Stephanie grows an apple tree which she calls her "tree of freedom". They are dismayed to discover that there is a rival claim to their land made by a British sympathizer. As the war comes closer, Indian raids increase, Jonathan becomes a courier for the Governor of Virginia, and Stephanie's older brother Noel joins an expedition against the Indians with George Rogers Clark.

References

1949 American novels
Children's historical novels
American children's novels
Newbery Honor-winning works
Novels set during the American Revolutionary War
Novels set in Appalachia
Novels set in Kentucky
Fiction set in 1780
Novels set in the 1780s
Viking Press books
1949 children's books
Plants in children literature